House at 285 Sea Cliff Avenue is a historic home located at Sea Cliff in Nassau County, New York.  It was built in 1884 and is a -story clapboard house with a square plan and cross-gabled roof in the Italianate style.  It features deep overhanging eaves with decorative scrollsawn brackets and round arched windows.

It was listed on the National Register of Historic Places in 1988.

References

Houses on the National Register of Historic Places in New York (state)
Italianate architecture in New York (state)
Houses in Nassau County, New York
Houses completed in 1884
National Register of Historic Places in Nassau County, New York